Cristeen Smith (born 5 November 1956) is a paralympic athlete from New Zealand competing mainly in category T52 track events and F53 Field events.

Cristeen is a three time Paralympic medalist, having competed at two paralympics.  Her first games came in Barcelona in 1992 Summer Paralympics where she competed in the 100m, 200m, 400m and 800m winning the 100m in the T52 class and setting a new World Record.  The following games in 1996 saw her compete in the 200m, 400m and 800m winning gold in the 200m setting a new Paralympic Record and silver in the 800m

Cristeen remains the current F53 world record holder in 2   F53 field events

F53 -Shot put       - 5.88	     - 28 July 1994	at IPC World Championships 	Berlin, Germany

F53 -Pentathlon  - 5167         - 5  Aug 1993      at  Stoke Mandeville Games           Great Britain

previously held world records in 
F53 Javelin (before changes to javelin weight and length)
      
F53 -Discus          - 14.46     - 26 July 1995      at  Stoke Mandeville Games           Great Britain

T52 - 100mts track sprint

T52 - 200mts track sprint

In 2000 Cristeen was named Auckland Parafed New Zealand - Athlete of the Century

References

External links 
 
 

1956 births
Living people
New Zealand wheelchair racers
Paralympic athletes of New Zealand
Paralympic gold medalists for New Zealand
Paralympic silver medalists for New Zealand
Paralympic medalists in athletics (track and field)
Athletes (track and field) at the 1992 Summer Paralympics
Athletes (track and field) at the 1996 Summer Paralympics
Medalists at the 1992 Summer Paralympics
Medalists at the 1996 Summer Paralympics
World record holders in Paralympic athletics